Thelenella indica is a species of foliicolous (leaf-dwelling) lichen in the family Thelenellaceae. Found in India, it was formally described as a new species in 2006 by Athokpam Pinokiyo and Krishna Pal Singh. The type specimen was collected by the first author in a tropical forest along the Assam-Linzey road in the East Sikkim district; here it was found growing on the leaves of a small Schima wallichii tree. It appears to be endemic to the Sikkim region of India.

The lichen has a greyish-brown, verrucose (warted) thallus lacking a cortex. The photobiont partner of Thelenella indica is a species of green alga from family Chlorococcaceae with rounded cells measuring 6–12 μm in diameter, and occurring in groups of 5–18 cells.

References

Lecanoromycetes
Lichen species
Lichens described in 2006
Lichens of India